Unlike the other legislatures of the Fifth French Republic, the eighth legislature from 1986 to 1988 had proportional representation by department.  This table summarises representatives from Ain in the 7th, 8th and 9th legislatures.

See also
Aisne deputies to the eighth legislature of the French fifth republic

References

 Ain
Deputies for Ain (French Fifth Republic)